Sylvia Boorstein is an American author, psychotherapist, and Buddhist teacher.

Boorstein studied with Dipa Ma and is a co-founding teacher at Spirit Rock Meditation Center in Woodacre, California and a senior teacher at the Insight Meditation Society in Barre, Massachusetts.

Biography
All four of Boorstein's grandparents were Jewish immigrants from Eastern Europe. Boorstein grew up in Brooklyn, New York, and attended Barnard College. After moving to California in 1961, Boorstein earned a master's degree in social work from the University of California Berkeley in 1967 and a Ph.D. in Psychology from Saybrook University in 1974.

She has written numerous books such as It's Easier Than You Think: The Buddhist Way to Happiness, That's Funny, You Don't Look Buddhist, Don't Just Do Something, Sit There and Pay Attention for Goodness' Sake.

References

External links
Official website
Dharma talks by Boorstein

Living people
Jewish American writers
Buddhist writers
Barnard College alumni
UC Berkeley School of Social Welfare alumni
Writers from Brooklyn
American psychotherapists
American spiritual writers
American women non-fiction writers
20th-century American non-fiction writers
20th-century American women writers
21st-century American non-fiction writers
21st-century American women writers
Writers from California
Students of Dipa Ma
Year of birth missing (living people)
21st-century American Jews
American women educators
Educators from New York City
Women religious writers